Suard is a French surname. Notable people with the surname include:

Amélie Suard (1743–1830), French writer and salonnière
Jean-Baptiste-Antoine Suard (1732–1817), French journalist, translator and writer
Pierre Suard (born 1934), French electrical engineer

French-language surnames